Siemianice may refer to the following places in Poland:
Siemianice, Lower Silesian Voivodeship (south-west Poland)
Siemianice, Greater Poland Voivodeship (west-central Poland)
Siemianice, Pomeranian Voivodeship (north Poland)